Bijanbari College, established in 1995, is a general degree college in Bijanbari, Darjeeling. It is affiliated to the University of North Bengal and offers undergraduate courses in the arts disciplines.

Departments
English
Nepali
History
Political Science
Economics

Management and recognitions
The college is currently managed by Prabhat Pradhan, the former Principal of the Kurseong College. Samir Sharma, Assistant Professor of Political Science, is the teacher-in-charge of the college.

Jas Yonzone 'Pyasi', the former Principal of Bijanbari Degree College, was conferred the prestigious Sahitya Academy Award in 2004.

There is a plan to shift the college from its present location midway between Bijanbari and Kaijalay to the Bijanbari town.

See also

References

External links
Bijanbari College 
University of North Bengal
University Grants Commission
National Assessment and Accreditation Council

Colleges affiliated to University of North Bengal
Educational institutions established in 1995
Universities and colleges in Darjeeling district
1995 establishments in West Bengal